Bojjala Gopalakrishna Reddy (15 April 1949 – 6 May 2022) was an Indian politician elected to serve as the Member of the Legislative Assembly for Srikalahasti constituency in Andhra Pradesh, India, between 1989–1994, 1994–1999, 1999–2004, 2009–2014, and since 2014. He represented the Telugu Desam Party.
He worked as Minister for Environment & Forests, Science & Technology, Cooperation in Nara Chandrababu Naidu Government.

Early life
Reddy was born 15 April 1949 in Urandur village in Chittoor district, Andhra Pradesh, India. His father Ganga Subbarami Reddy was an MLA from Sri Kalahasti constituency. He received his Bachelor of Science degree in 1968 and Bachelor of Laws in 1972 from Sri Venkateswara University.

He married Brunda, daughter of congress minister late Peddireddy Thimmaa Reddy.

Political career

After his marriage, Reddy moved to Hyderabad to pursue his career in law. Later he decided to enter politics. Reddy got a TDP ticket in 1989 and he won the election with big majority. Since then he was elected to Sri Kalahasti constituency 3 more times. During his tenure between 1994 and 2004, he served as cabinet minister for various departments including Information Technology and R&B. He was a close aide of Telugu Desam Party chief N Chandra Babu Naidu.
He has won the A.P. elections in 2014 as a legislator of Srikalahasti constituency for the record fourth time. He was one of the council of Ministers who took Oath on 8 June 2014 and was the Cabinet Minister for Environment, forest, Science and Technology and Cooperative.

Alipiri Bomb Blast

On 1 October 2003, Bojjala Gopalkrishna Reddy along with Andhra Pradesh Chief Minister Chandrababu Naidu received minor injuries when a mine blast hit the chief minister's convoy at Alipiri Road.

Chandrababu Naidu along with Reddy was on his way to Tirupati, where Brahmotsavam celebrations are on at the Lord Venkateswara temple.

Gopala Krishna Reddy received injuries to his shoulder and chest.
Chandrababu Naidu received minor injuries to his chest, nose and right hand.

Death
Reddy died of a heart attack on 6 May 2022 in a hospital in Hyderabad while he was undergoing treatment.

References

1949 births
2022 deaths
Andhra Pradesh MLAs 1989–1994
Andhra Pradesh MLAs 1994–1999
Andhra Pradesh MLAs 1999–2004
Andhra Pradesh MLAs 2009–2014
Andhra Pradesh MLAs 2014–2019
State cabinet ministers of Andhra Pradesh
Telugu Desam Party politicians
Sri Venkateswara University alumni
Telugu politicians
People from Chittoor district